Daying is a town of Gaoyi County in southwestern Hebei province, China, located east of the county seat opposite G4 Beijing–Hong Kong and Macau Expressway. , it has 25 villages under its administration.

See also
List of township-level divisions of Hebei

References

Township-level divisions of Hebei
Gaoyi County